Shinjuku Niagara Falls is a fountain in Tokyo's Shinjuku Central Park, in Shinjuku, Japan. The Tokyo Weekender has described the water feature as "generously named".

References

External links
 
 Shinjuku Niagara Falls at Emporis

Fountains in Asia
Shinjuku